XHKR-FM is a radio station on 96.9 FM in Tuxtla Gutiérrez, Chiapas. It is owned by Radio S.A. and carries its Máxima adult contemporary format.

History
XHTG-FM received its concession on June 18, 1980. It was owned by Francisco Águilar Trujillo. By 2000, it had changed its callsign to XHKR. (The station is not related to the current XHTG, also in Tuxtla, which migrated from the AM band.)

In 2013 the Águilar family sold the station to Radio S.A. and transferred ownership in the concessionaire to the Quiñones family.

References

Radio stations in Chiapas